Krivo srastanje is the fifth studio album of the rock band Azra, released through Jugoton in 1984.

Track listing
All music and lyrics written by Branimir Štulić, except tracks 7 and 10 (Traditional).

Personnel 
Azra
Branimir Štulić – Guitars, bass, lead vocals
Boris Leiner – Drums

Artwork
Greiner & Kropilak – Design

Production
Branimir Štulić – Producer
Siniša Škarica - Executive producer
Recorded by Peter Siedlaczek and Ante Cetinić

References
 www.discogs.com

Azra albums
1984 albums
Jugoton albums